Bağbanlar may refer to:
 Bağbanlar, Agdam, Azerbaijan
 Bağbanlar, Bilasuvar, Azerbaijan
 Bagbanlar, Ganja, Azerbaijan
 Bağbanlar, Samukh, Azerbaijan

See also 
 Bagbanli (disambiguation)